Institute for Political Ecology (short:IPE, original Croatian name: Institut za političku ekologiju) is a Zagreb (Croatia) based research and educational organisation, which aspires to shape alternative development models and innovative democratic solutions for political and economic transformations of society.

IPE focuses on relations between contemporary ecological changes as social phenomena and social inequalities and power relations, but also "designs alternative development models and innovative institutional frameworks for democratic political and economic transformation of society" and self-describes as "a dynamic and diverse group driving, supporting and shaping change towards ecologically sustainable, just and democratic society." Some of the its key topics in recent years were: climate-justice, commons, degrowth and femization of politics.  

IPE does transdisciplinary research, publishes work and runs educational programs in cooperation with domestic and international institutions and organisations. It runs the biggest (regular and periodical since 2010) Green Academy (Croatia) event in the region and one of the most prominent in Europe. IPE provides expertise and establishes discussion platform for social movements and political and economic actors in Croatia, South-East and Central Europe, advocating ecologically sustainable, just and democratic society.

IPE is associate member of Green European Foundation, has strong ties to Heinrich Böll Foundation and numerous partnerships and collaborations with other foundations, including Open Society Foundations and Rosa Luxemburg Foundation. IPE's networks include from international academic researchers to (trans)-local municipal, commons focused or green-activists like Green Action and Friends of the Earth Europe.

IPE's was founded 10.06.2014 and soon became active with around 20 team members (includes junior researchers and fellows), an academic council and managing board with director Vedran Horvat.

References

External links 
 

 
Environmental organizations based in Croatia
Organizations based in Zagreb